Evicted may refer to eviction, the removal of a tenant from rental property.

Evicted may also refer to:

 "Evicted (Flight of the Conchords)", the 2009 series finale episode of the comedy TV show, Flight of the Conchords
 "Evicted!" (2010), season 1 episode 12 of the animated TV series, Adventure Time
 Evicted: Poverty and Profit in the American City (2016), a non-fiction book about the poorest areas in Milwaukee